Rahim Khan(Urdu:رحيم خان)- a former Olympian and inventor of reverse flick, is a hockey legend who was  member of Pakistan field hockey team  who won the Men's World cup hockey tournament in 1994. He played 126 international matches by scoring 25 international goals and most on them on the reverse flick, he invented. He plays at right- in position.

Rahim Khan was born on 20 April 1971  at Mingora city of Swat District. He started hockey at school level. Earlier he played for a local club;Eleven Star, Saidu Sharif many years. He was first selected at national level, by Pakistan WAPDA hockey team. Then he joined Pakistan International Airlines (P.I.A) hockey club. He  was selected for Pakistani squad in 1991. Former Olympian, Rahim Khan played  five Champions Trophies, two World Cup and Atlanta Olympic. He won gold medal in 1994 Champions Trophy and World Cup, bronze medals in Asia Cup and Asian Games, silver medal in SAF Games and gold medal in World  Cup Qualifying round in his hockey carrier from 1991-1998. He was also awarded President Pride of Performance by Government of Pakistan. Rahim Khan is currently running a hockey coaching academy at Peshawar.

See also 

List of Pakistani field hockey players

References

External links
 

Pakistani male field hockey players
Olympic field hockey players of Pakistan
Field hockey players at the 1996 Summer Olympics
1998 Men's Hockey World Cup players
People from Swat District
Living people
1971 births
Asian Games medalists in field hockey
Field hockey players at the 1994 Asian Games
Asian Games bronze medalists for Pakistan
Medalists at the 1994 Asian Games